Charles Keck (September 9, 1875 – April 23, 1951) was an American sculptor from New York City, New York.

Early life and education
Keck studied at the National Academy of Design and the Art Students League of New York with Philip Martiny, and was an assistant to Augustus Saint-Gaudens from 1893 to 1898.  He also attended the American Academy in Rome.  In 1921 he was elected into the National Academy of Design as an Associate member and became a full Academician in 1928. He is best known for his monuments and architectural sculpture. His work was also part of the sculpture event in the art competition at the 1932 Summer Olympics. His interment was located at Fishkill Rural cemetery.

Career

Architectural sculpture
Brooklyn Museum, Genius of Islam, McKim, Mead and White, architects, NYC, 1908
Pennsylvania Hall, University of Pittsburgh, Pittsburgh, Pennsylvania, 1908
America at the Soldiers and Sailors National Military Museum and Memorial, Pittsburgh, 1910
Oakland City Hall, Palmer & Hornbostel architects, Oakland, California, 1914
Pittsburgh City-County Building, Palmer & Hornbostel architects, Pittsburgh, Pennsylvania, 1916
Wilmington City Hall, Palmer & Hornbostel architects, Wilmington, Delaware, 1917
Design of the doors of the John B. Murphy Memorial Building, Chicago, Illinois, 1926 
Education Building, Albany, New York
Nelson Gallery of Art, Kansas City, Missouri
Waldorf Astoria Hotel, Schultze & Weaver architects, NYC, 1931
Essex County Building Annex, Newark, New Jersey, c. 1930
Jackson County Court House, Wight & Wight, architects,  Kansas City Missouri, 1934
Bronx County Courthouse, Freedlander & Hausle architects, Bronx, New York, 1933
Campus gates, Columbia University, New York City

Monuments and memorials
Minot Monument, Goshen, New York, with architect Thomas Harlan Ellett, dedicated May, 1912.
Amicitia, Rio de Janeiro, Brazil
George Washington, Buenos Aires, Argentina
Manchester Bridge statues, Pittsburgh, Pennsylvania, 1917
Meriwether Lewis and William Clark, Charlottesville, Virginia, 1919
Thomas Jonathan Jackson, Charlottesville, Virginia, 1921
Duke Family sarcophagi, Memorial Chapel, Duke University, Durham, North Carolina
61st District War Memorial, (sculpture), Greenwood Playground, Ocean Parkway at Fort Hamilton Parkway Brooklyn, New York, 1922 
John Mitchell, Scranton, PA, 1924
Liberty Monument, Ticonderoga, New York, 1924
Lifting the Veil of Ignorance, statue of Booker T. Washington in Tuskegee, Alabama, 1927 (replica in Atlanta, Georgia)
Angel of Peace, Exhibition Place, Toronto, 1930
The Lincoln Monument of Wabash, Indiana, 1932
 Statue of Charles Brantley Aycock, National Statuary Hall Collection, U.S. Capitol, 1935
Father Francis P. Duffy, Duffy Square, New York City, 1937
Huey Long Memorial, Baton Rouge, Louisiana, 1940
Huey Long, National Statuary Hall Collection in the Capitol in Washington D.C., 1941
Young Lincoln, Senn Park, Chicago, Illinois, 1945
Andrew Jackson, Kansas City, Missouri
Ernest Haass Memorial, Woodlawn Cemetery, Detroit, Michigan
George Rogers Clark Memorial, Springfield, Ohio
Listening Post, Lynchburg, Virginia

In 1913 Keck designed a memorial plaque that was cast from metal that had been salvaged from the  after it was raised in Havana harbor the previous year.  Over a thousand of the plaques were cast and they are spread unevenly all over the United States. In 1931, Keck completed the Great Seals of the Commonwealth of Virginia which had been commissioned by the Commonwealth.  The obverse of the seal is still used and appears on the state flag.

Numismatic works
1915-S Panama-Pacific Exposition Gold Dollar
1927 Vermont, Battle of Bennington Sesquicentennial Half Dollar
1936 Lynchburg Sesquicentennial Half Dollar

Other works

 Letters and Science, Columbia University, New York City, 1915 and 1925

Notes

References
 Kvaran & Lockley, Guide to the Architectural Sculpture in America, unpublished manuscript

External links

 
 https://www.aaa.si.edu/collections/charles-keck-papers-9130

1875 births
1951 deaths
20th-century American sculptors
20th-century American male artists
American architectural sculptors
Artists from New York City
Art Students League of New York alumni
National Academy of Design alumni
National Academy of Design members
19th-century American sculptors
American male sculptors
National Sculpture Society members
Sculptors from New York (state)
19th-century American male artists
American currency designers
Coin designers
Olympic competitors in art competitions